Csőke is a Hungarian surname. Notable people with the surname include:

 Adrienn Csőke (born 1973), Hungarian chess master
 Katalin Csőke (1957–2017), Hungarian discus thrower

Hungarian-language surnames